Villain was a wooden roller coaster at the Geauga Lake amusement park in Aurora, Ohio. It was designed by the now-defunct Custom Coasters International (CCI). The ride opened as a part of the four-coaster expansion Six Flags brought to Geauga Lake between 1999 and 2000. It was a wooden hybrid, which means it had steel supports but had wood track. When it originally opened, the ride was moderately smooth, but by 2001 it deteriorated and was re-tracked during the off-season.  This was the second CCI coaster to feature a "trick track" element (the first was Shivering Timbers at Michigan's Adventure) where the track banks from one side to another while staying otherwise on a straight path.

Rocky Mountain Construction, an Idaho-based manufacturing firm, handled the construction of the ride. The ride had been retracked by Martin & Vleminckx.

Currently, the Villain's trains are at Kings Island, another Cedar Fair park in Mason, OH. It is unknown what they will be used for. 

On June 17, 2008, Villain was sold for scrap to Cleveland Scrap for $2,500. The ride has since been demolished.

Demolition
In September 2007, Geauga Lake shut down and only the water park, Wildwater Kingdom, remained open until September 2016, following the same fate of Geauga Lake. Most of its rides have been moved to other amusement parks, but only the wooden coasters and the steel coaster Double Loop have not been saved.

Incidents
In July 2000 when the amusement park was Six Flags Ohio, forty-four-year-old Terri Wang of Milwaukee, Wisconsin, was injured while riding Villain.  While on the ride Wang was struck with several objects that were believed to be rocks or a cell phone.  The impact of the objects caused her to endure a fractured skull and broken nose.  Park officials had previously been warned about patrons who were throwing rocks at rides.  With that, rocks were found on the ground below the roller coaster as well as on the catwalk and track.  However, a park attorney theorized that Wang was struck with a cell phone.  Wang sued Six Flags because of the injuries that she sustained.  The trial was held at Portage County Common Pleas Court and the jury determined Six Flags was guilty of negligence.  Wang was awarded $1.1 million for medical expenses and $2.5 million in punitive damages because of the trial’s verdict.

References

External links

The Villain on Ultimate Rollercoaster

Roller coasters operated by Six Flags
Roller coasters operated by Cedar Fair
Former roller coasters in Ohio
Geauga Lake